Edgar E. Lien was a member of the Wisconsin State Assembly.

Biography
Lien was born on August 3, 1936, in Milwaukee, Wisconsin. He graduated from Lutheran High School in Milwaukee and Valparaiso University and would serve in the Wisconsin Army National Guard. Lien died of pancreatic cancer on October 30, 2000, in Madison, Wisconsin.

Political career
Lien was elected to the Assembly in 1962. Additionally, he was City Attorney of Bloomer, Wisconsin. He was a Republican.

References

Politicians from Milwaukee
People from Bloomer, Wisconsin
Republican Party members of the Wisconsin State Assembly
Wisconsin lawyers
Military personnel from Milwaukee
United States Army soldiers
Valparaiso University alumni
1936 births
2000 deaths
Deaths from pancreatic cancer
20th-century American lawyers
20th-century American politicians